Laon is a city in the Aisne department in Hauts-de-France in northern France.

History

Early history
The holy district of Laon, which rises a hundred metres above the otherwise flat Picardy plain, has always held strategic importance. In the time of Julius Caesar there was a Gallic village named Bibrax where the Remis (inhabitants of the country round Reims) had to meet the onset of the confederated Belgae. Whatever may have been the precise locality of that battlefield, Laon was fortified by the Romans, and successively checked the invasions of the Franks, Burgundians, Vandals, Alans and Huns. At that time it was known as Alaudanum or Lugdunum Clavatum.

Archbishop Remigius of Reims, who baptised Clovis, was born in the Laonnais, and it was he who, at the end of the fifth century, instituted the bishopric of Laon. Thenceforward Laon was one of the principal towns of the kingdom of the Franks, and the possession of it was often disputed. Charles the Bald had enriched its church with the gift of very numerous domains. In about 847 the Irish philosopher John Scotus Eriugena appeared at the court of Charles the Bald, and was appointed head of the palace school. Eriugena spent the rest of his days in France, probably at Paris and Laon.

Laon was the principal city of the late Carolingian kings of France, beginning with Louis IV.  After the fall of the Carolingians, Laon took the part of Charles of Lorraine, their heir, and Hugh Capet only succeeded in making himself master of the town by the connivance of the bishop, who, in return for this service, was made second ecclesiastical peer of the kingdom.

Early in the twelfth century the communes of France set about emancipating themselves, and the history of the commune of Laon is one of the richest and most varied. Anselm of Laon's school for theology and exegesis rapidly became the most famous in Europe. The citizens had profited by a temporary absence of Bishop Gaudry to secure from his representatives a communal charter, but he, on his return, purchased from the king of France the revocation of this document, and recommenced his oppressions. The consequence was a revolt, in which the episcopal palace was burnt and the bishop and several of his partisans were put to death on 25 April 1112. The fire spread to the cathedral, and reduced it to ashes. Uneasy at the result of their victory, the rioters went into hiding outside the town, which was anew pillaged by the people of the neighbourhood, eager to avenge the death of their bishop.

Thereafter, French monarchs intervened as needed to settle disputes between the bishop and the townspeople until 1331, when the commune was abolished. In the latter stages of the 1337–1463 Hundred Years' War, Laon was captured by Philip, Duke of Burgundy; he relinquished control to his English allies, who held it until 1429 when it fell to Charles VII of France. The Catholic League used the town as a base during the French Wars of Religion; it was retaken by the former Huguenot Henry IV in August 1594.

Modern history
At the Revolution (1789) Laon permanently lost its rank as a bishopric. During the campaign of 1814, Napoleon tried in vain to dislodge Blücher and Bülow from it in the Battle of Laon.

In 1870, during the Franco-Prussian War, an engineer blew up the powder magazine of the citadel at the moment when the German troops were entering the town. Many people died; and the cathedral and the old episcopal palace were damaged. It surrendered to a German force on 9 September 1870.

In the fall of 1914, during World War I, German forces captured the town and held it until the Allied offensive in the summer of 1918.

Geography
Located in the middle of Aisne, Laon borders (from the north, clockwise) with the municipalities of Aulnois-sous-Laon, Barenton-Bugny, Chambry, Athies-sous-Laon, Bruyères-et-Montbérault, Vorges, Presles-et-Thierny, Chivy-lès-Étouvelles, Clacy-et-Thierret, Molinchart, Cerny-lès-Bucy, and Besny-et-Loizy.

Population

Sights

The city contains numerous medieval buildings, including the cathedral Notre-Dame of Laon, dating mostly from the 12th and 13th centuries. The chapter-house and the cloister contain specimens of early 13th century architecture. The old episcopal palace, contiguous to the cathedral, is now used as a court-house. The front, flanked by turrets, is pierced by large pointed windows. There is also a Gothic cloister and an old chapel of two storeys, of a date anterior to the cathedral.

The church of St Martin dates from the middle of the 12th century. The old abbey buildings of the same foundation are now used as the hospital. The museum of Laon had collections of sculpture and painting. In its garden there is a chapel of the Templars belonging to the 12th century.

One of the oldest churches in the city is St John the Baptist, in the nearby neighborhood of Vaux-sous-Laon, which dates from the 11th through 13th centuries and is built in a mixture of Romanesque and Gothic styles.

Transportation

Laon railway station offers connections to Reims, Soissons and Paris.

Until August 2016, the town had the only fully automated municipal cable car system in the world, called the Poma 2000. It linked the upper town (the historical centre, located on a plateau) with the lower town, had three stations and ran on rubber tyres. In contrast, the San Francisco cable car system is manually operated, and most other automated cable car systems have restricted operations within airports and hospitals, though another automated cable car called the Minimetrò may be found in Perugia.

The town's transport company TUL (Transports Urbains Laonnois) operates the local bus routes.

International relations

Laon is twinned with:
  Soltau, Germany (since 1972)
  Winchester, United Kingdom

Personalities
Laon was the birthplace of:
 Bertrada of Laon (690–721 CE), mother of Charlemagne
 Anselm of Laon (d. 1117), theologian
 Father Jacques Marquette, (1636–1675), Jesuit missionary, Namesake of Marquette University along with scores of other institutions and locales in the United States
   Antoine (ca. 1598–1648), Louis (ca. 1600/1605-1648) and Mathieu (1607–1677) Le Nain, painters
 Pierre Méchain (1744–1804), astronomer
 Auguste Bottée de Toulmon (1764–1816), general inspector of powders and saltpeter.
 Jules François Felix Fleury-Husson (1820–1889) Author and art and literary critic (Known as Champfleury)
 Edgar Raoul-Duval (1832–1887), magistrate and politician
 Florent Raimy (b. 1986), footballer

Gallery

In the media
Laon is featured in the book Pursuit of Passy by David Moore Crook.
Laon is also featured in the book "A Pilgrimage to Eternity" by Timothy Egan.

See also
 Marcel Gaumont, Sculptor of war memorial

Notes

References

External links

  Unofficial site
 Official site
 Historical footage of Loan, shot from an airplane in 1918, filmportal.de
 St John the Baptist de Vaux
 Templar Chapel

 
Communes of Aisne
Prefectures in France